Carol Chen Wan-hui (born 11 September 1974) is a Taiwanese politician.

Early life, education, and career

Chen was born on 11 September 1974. She is also known by the English name Carol Chen. After completing an Executive Master of Business Administration degree at National Chengchi University, she served as secretary-general of the Financial Literacy and Education Association.

Political career
In 2019, Chen joined the newly founded Taiwan People's Party, and was ranked ninth on the party list for proportional representation. Although she was not elected to the Legislative Yuan during the 2020 legislative election, the TPP named Chen director of its legislative caucus office. She retained the post after accepting the party's nomination for the Yilan County magistracy in July 2022. During her magisterial campaign, Chen discussed water reclamation and storage proposals in Yilan, and made public appearances alongside TPP candidates for local legislative office. Chen won 16,412 votes, or 6.98 percent of the vote, finishing behind Kuomintang incumbent magistrate Lin Zi-miao and Democratic Progressive Party candidate . Chen subsequently succeeded Ann Kao, who had won the Hsinchu mayoralty, as a member of the Legislative Yuan.

References

1974 births
Living people
21st-century Taiwanese women politicians
Members of the 10th Legislative Yuan
Taiwan People's Party Members of the Legislative Yuan
Party List Members of the Legislative Yuan
National Chengchi University alumni
Politicians of the Republic of China on Taiwan from Tainan